"Troublemaker"  is a song by English recording artist Olly Murs, released as the lead single from his third studio album, Right Place Right Time (2012). It features American rapper Flo Rida. "Troublemaker" was co-written by Murs, Steve Robson, Claude Kelly and Flo Rida, and was produced by Robson. The song premiered on 8 October 2012, in the United Kingdom on the Capital FM radio station and was made available to download on 12 October in certain international territories.

"Troublemaker" was a major commercial success. In the United Kingdom, the song debuted atop the UK Singles Chart, making it Murs' fourth solo single to reach number one and his first to spend more than a week at the top spot. It also served as the closing song at Murs's 2013 arena tour. As of 2021, it is Murs' best selling single to date.

Background and release
"Troublemaker" was written by Olly Murs along with Claude Kelly and Steve Robson, with whom he also wrote his previous hits "Please Don't Let Me Go" and "Dance with Me Tonight". Lyrically Murs has said that the song is about "that special girl that you can't shake off, even if you know you should because, let's face it, she's got a bit of a wild side."

Murs said that although he initially expected it would be difficult to get Flo Rida to appear on the track, it was "kind of easy, in a way. [It] wasn't hard ... We just literally sent him the track, his people heard the track and they really liked it. And Flo Rida was like, 'I really want to do it'. So he was up for doing it." Flo Rida spoke about Murs and his appearance on the track during a promotional interview for his single "I Cry" on ITV breakfast show Daybreak on 26 September 2012, saying: "I'm very excited, [my record company said] we have this record from a guy named Olly. As soon as I heard it, I know a hit record when I hear it. I'll probably have a chance to meet him soon." "Troublemaker" premiered in the United Kingdom on 8 October 2012 on Capital FM.  The premiere was followed by a "bold and colourful" lyric video that was posted on Murs' Vevo account. At a launch party for the album, Murs revealed that "Troublemaker" was originally meant to be the second single from the album with "Army of Two" being the first single, but this idea was scrapped due to Murs' work in America.

Composition 

"Troublemaker" is an uptempo pop song which lasts for a duration of three minutes and six seconds, containing influences of soul. According to the digital sheet music published by Alfred Music Publishing, "Troublemaker" is written in the key of C minor and it is set at a groove of 106 beats per minute. The chorus is written in E-flat major. Described as an "airy pop anthem" the songs' instrumentation consists of "lightly funky, guitar-led backdrop", which some critics have compared the guitar riffs to Maroon 5's "This Love" and "Misery".

Reception

Critical reception
The song received positive reviews from critics. Seventeen wrote that it is "upbeat and just as catchy" as Murs previous single "Heart Skips a Beat". Amy Sciarretto of PopCrush called it "an uptempo pop delight". John Aizlewood of BBC Music favored Flo Rida's appearance describing it as an "engaging cameo". Robert Copsey of Digital Spy gave the song a four out of five star rating, praising its composition, but he criticised Flo Rida's appearance, describing it "confusing, [...] but if it makes Olly a hit across the pond, we suppose we can let it slide." Idolator's Robbie Daw echoed Copsey's comments describing the song " a total disco-pop winner, and would stand on its own without [Flo Rida]." The song was nominated for Best British Single at the 2013 BRIT Awards, which was held on 20 February 2013, but lost out to Adele's "Skyfall".

Chart performance
"Troublemaker" was first released in the Netherlands on 18 October 2012 and peaked at number 98 on the Single Top 100. In the United Kingdom, "Troublemaker" debuted at number one with 121,000 copies on 2 December 2012. With "Troublemaker" debuting atop the singles chart, it marked Murs' fourth and Flo Rida's fifth number one single in the UK. In its second week the song retained its number-one position scoring his first "chart double" with Right Place Right Time. Murs was the fourth act in 2012 to achieve that feat following Gary Barlow, Robbie Williams and One Direction. "Troublemaker" sold over 441,000 copies in the UK in 2012, becoming the 29th biggest-seller of the year. As of November 2016, it has sold 765,000 copies, making it Murs' second best-selling song, behind "Dance with Me Tonight".

"Troublemaker" debuted at number nineteen on the Australian Singles Chart on 9 December 2012, becoming the second-highest debut for the week. The following week the song entered the top-ten peaking at number four. The song has been certified double-platinum by the Australian Recording Industry Association, denoting shipments of 140,000 copies. "Troublemaker" entered the New Zealand Singles Chart at number fourteen on 10 December 2012, giving Murs his first single to chart in that country. On its fourth week the song cracked the top-ten reaching number eight and remained at that position two weeks, before gaining a new peak of number seven on 14 January 2013. "Troublemaker" has received a gold certification from the Recording Industry Association of New Zealand (RIANZ), denoting shipments of 7,500 copies. On 31 December 2012 the song debuted at number 38 on the Billboard Pop Songs chart. It debuted at number 87 on the Billboard Hot 100 on 24 January 2013, and has continued climbing every week since, with its current peak now at number 25, making it Murs' highest charting US single to date. It has sold over a million downloads in the US as of May 2013.

Music video

Background
The official music video was filmed in Los Angeles, California over two days, on 21 and 22 September 2012. An American casting agency site revealed in their advert that the story of the video revolves around Murs and a female lead who is "so ditzy she keeps getting fired from her jobs, and by coincidence, keeps crossing paths with Olly." Another casting agency released a montage of pictures from the set of filming of the video on their Facebook page on 26 September, including a shot of Murs being arrested by a police officer which did not make the final version. Flo Rida filmed his part of the video separately to Murs in Miami, Florida on 30 September, and released a picture of himself at the filming location on his Instagram account that same day. The video premiered on Murs' YouTube account on 22 October 2012 and has since been viewed over 192 million times.

Synopsis
The video starts with Murs entering a cafe, where he sees a young woman (played by actress Danielle Beckwith) working as a waitress there. She pours water on a customer in retaliation to him smacking her bottom, causing her to be fired by her boss. He then meets the woman again, who is now working in a record shop and sees her stacking records (including one that has picture of Murs on it that says "Olly Murs' Greatest Hits"), but due to her wearing headphones she can't hear what a customer is saying to her and gets fired again. Next, Murs sees her working at a clothes store where she is dressing mannequins but when she notices Murs watching her she ends up knocking them over and then takes her jacket and leaves the store. Flo Rida is then seen in a billboard on a beach next to a luxury car with two bikini clad women inside it. The video ends with Murs seeing the woman again, this time in a nightclub with friends where she accidentally knocks over a man carrying a tray of drinks, setting off a further chain of arguments. Murs comes to her rescue and the two begin to leave but are stopped by one of the club's bouncers and the screen cuts to black with the word "Troublemaker".

Live performances 
On 5 November 2012, Murs uploaded a live performance of "Troublemaker" to his official Vevo account. The live performance showcased his vocals in a laid-back alternate take on the song which was backed with a string section and further male vocalists. Trent Maynard of 4Music described the performance as "stunning" and praised Murs for "nailing flawless vocals" and his "star power" without the presence of Flo Rida. "Troublemaker" was performed for the first time on 12 October 2012 at "Love Music Live" gig organised by Heart Radio in London. On 18 November 2012, Murs performed the song on the ninth season of The X Factor UK.

In the United States, Murs performed the song for the first time on the daytime chat show Live! with Kelly and Michael on 23 January 2013. He also performed an acoustic version of the song for Billboard magazine's Next Big Things' Session along with "Heart Skips a Beat". In April 2013, he made a guest appearance on the fifth season of the American drama series, 90210 as himself and performed "Troublemaker" and "Right Place Right Time".

During the Never Been Better Tour, Murs would normally sing the song solo, but on the dates at the O2 Arena in London and the Liverpool Echo Arena, Murs was joined by Robbie Williams (London date) and John Bishop (Liverpool date).

Track listing

Digital download
 "Troublemaker" – 3:06

CD single
 "Troublemaker" – 3:06
 "Troublemaker" – (Cutmore Club Mix) – 4:38

iTunes Remixes EP
 "Troublemaker" – 3:06
 "Troublemaker" (Cutmore Club Mix) – 4:38
 "Troublemaker" (Cutmore Radio Edit) – 2:35
 "Troublemaker" (Wideboys Radio Edit) – 3:23

Charts

Weekly charts

Year-end charts

Certifications

Radio and release history

References

2012 singles
Flo Rida songs
Olly Murs songs
Number-one singles in Scotland
UK Singles Chart number-one singles
Song recordings produced by Steve Robson
Songs written by Olly Murs
Songs written by Steve Robson
Songs written by Claude Kelly
Songs written by Flo Rida
2012 songs
Syco Music singles